The Aro Confederacy (1690–1902) was a political union orchestrated by the Aro people, Igbo subgroup, centered in Arochukwu in present-day southeastern Nigeria. Their influence and presence was all over Eastern Nigeria,  lower Middle Belt,  and parts of present-day Cameroon and Equatorial Guinea during the 18th and 19th centuries. The  Arochukwu Kingdom was an economic, political, and an oracular center as it was home of the Ibini Ukpabi oracle, High Priests, the Aro King Eze Aro, and central council (Okpankpo).

Rise 

By the mid-18th century, several Aro business families had migrated to the Igbo hinterland and to adjacent areas as a result of the rise of the demand for slaves by Europe and for palm oil. This migration and their military power supported by their alliances with several related neighboring Igbo and eastern Cross River militarized states (particularly Ohafia, Edda, Abam, Abiriba, Afikpo, Ekoi, Bahumono, Amasiri etc.), quickly established the Aro Confederacy as a regional economic power.

Confederacy 

Aro activities on the coast helped the growth of city-states in the Niger Delta, and these city states became important centres for the export of palm oil and slaves. Such city-states included Opobo, Bonny, Nembe, Calabar, as well as other slave trading city-states controlled by the Ijaw, Efik, and Igbo. The Aros formed a strong trading network, colonies, and incorporated hundreds of communities that formed into powerful kingdoms. The Ajalli, Arondizuogu, Ndikelionwu, and Igbene Kingdoms were some of the most powerful Aro states in the Confederacy after Arochukwu. Some were founded and named after commanders and chiefs like Izuogu Mgbokpo and Iheme who led Aro/Abam forces to conquer Ikpa Ora and founded Arondizuogu. Later Aro commanders such as Okoro Idozuka (also of Arondizuogu) expanded the state's borders through warfare at the start of the 19th century. Aro migrations also played a large role in the expansion of Ozizza, Afikpo, Amasiri, Izombe, and many other city-states. For example, Aro soldiers founded at least three villages in Ozizza. The Aro Confederacy's power, however, derived mostly from its economic and religious position. With European colonists on their way at the end of the 19th century, things changed.

Decline 

During the 1890s, the Royal Niger Company of Britain bore friction with the Aros because of their economic dominance. The Aro resisted British penetration in the hinterland because their economic and religious influence was being threatened. The Aro and their allies launched offensives against British allies in Igboland and Ibibioland. After failed negotiations, the British attempted to conquer the Aro Confederacy in 1899. By 1901, the tensions were especially intensified when British prepared for the Aro Expedition. The invasion of Obegu (in Igboland) was the last major Aro offensive before the start of the Anglo-Aro War. In November 1901, the British launched the Aro Expedition and after strong Aro resistance, Arochukwu was captured on December 28, 1901. By early 1902, the war was over and the Aro Confederacy collapsed.

Contrary to the belief that the Ibini Ukpabi was destroyed, the shrine still exists, and is intact in Arochukwu and serves mainly as a tourist site.

References 

The Evolution of the Aro Confederacy in Southeastern Nigeria, 1690-1720.

External links 
Arookigbo.com
Countrystudies.us
Nigeriafirst.org
Apuncna.com
Aronewsonline.org
http://www.ebonyionline.com/the-concise-history-of-ozizza/

Countries in precolonial Africa
African civilizations
Aros
History of Nigeria
History of Cameroon
Former monarchies of Africa
States and territories established in 1690
States and territories disestablished in 1902
1690 establishments in Africa
1902 disestablishments in Nigeria